Christopher Eric Bouchat (born October 2, 1967) is an American politician. He is a member of the Maryland House of Delegates for District 5, which encompasses Carroll County, Maryland. He was previously a member of the Carroll County Board of Commissioners from 2018 to 2022, representing District 4 in southwest Carroll County.

Background
Bouchat graduated from St. Augustine's Catholic School (now St. Augustine Elementary School) and Howard High School. He attended the Howard Vocational-Technical Center, where he earned a welding certificate, Catonsville Community College, where he earned a degree in business administration, and the University of Maryland, Baltimore County, where he earned a degree in political science. Bouchat worked as a welder with Patrick Aircraft Tank Systems in Columbia, Maryland, before starting his own welding business in 1994.

Political involvement
Bouchat first became involved in politics in 1992, when he ran for the United States House of Representatives in Maryland's 3rd congressional district. In 1994, he unsuccessfully ran for the Maryland Senate in District 12, receiving 37 percent of the vote in the Republican primary.

From 2003 to 2004, Bouchat served on the Baltimore County Republican Central Committee.

In 2006, Bouchat ran for the Carroll County Board of Commissioners, challenging the three incumbent Republican commissioners. He once again rain for the Carroll County Board of Commissioners in 2010.

In October 2013, Bouchat filed to run for the Maryland House of Delegates in District 9A, seeking to succeed outgoing state delegate Gail H. Bates. Bouchat was the top vote-getter in the Carroll County part of the district, but lost the primary to Howard County Republicans Warren Miller and Trent Kittleman, both of whom went on to win the general election.

In 2018, Bouchat ran for the Carroll County Board of Commissioners in District 4, seeking to succeed outgoing county commissioner Richard Rothschild. He won the Republican primary in June, receiving 44.1 percent of the vote. He defeated Democrat Paul Johnson in the general election, receiving 65.5 percent of the vote, and was sworn in on December 4, 2018. On July 26, 2019, Bouchat announced that he would not seek re-election to a second term in 2022.

In March 2020, Bouchat expressed interest in running for the Maryland General Assembly. In December, Bouchat filed to fill a vacancy in the Maryland House of Delegates that was left vacant by the resignation of state delegate Warren Miller. His candidacy was endorsed by former state delegates Al Redmer Jr. and Donald E. Murphy. On January 6, 2021, fellow candidate Reid Novotny was selected to fill the rest of Miller's term. In 2022, Bouchat filed to run for the Maryland House of Delegates in District 9A, but was later redrawn into District 5. Bouchat won the Republican primary on July 20, receiving 12.1 percent of the vote. He ran unopposed in the general election.

Redistricting lawsuits
In 2012, Bouchat filed a lawsuit challenging the state's legislative redistricting plan, in which he pleaded to the Maryland Court of Appeals to establish a new legislative body that would have each county represented by two state senators and for the county's population to determine its number of state delegates, each belonging to a single-member district. The Court of Appeals issued an order upholding the state's redistricting plan, denying Bouchat's arguments against it. In January 2013, Bouchat appealed the case by filing a writ of certiorari to the Supreme Court of the United States. The Supreme Court denied the petition on April 15.

In early 2015, Bouchat filed a lawsuit in the Carroll County Circuit Court challenging the state's legislative redistricting plan, which was dismissed after the judge determined that the court did not have jurisdiction over the matter. In August 2015, Bouchat again filed a lawsuit challenging the state's legislative redistricting plan, blaming the composition of District 9A for his loss in the 2014 elections.

In the legislature
Bouchat was sworn into the Maryland House of Delegates on January 11, 2023. He is a member of the House Judiciary Committee. In March 2023, Bouchat said he did not plan to run for re-election in 2026.

In February 2023, Bouchat, a member of the Frederick County Delegation, said that he would not vote or make any motions during the delegation's weekly meetings. In an email to The Frederick News-Post, he said that delegation members who represent districts mostly in Washington or Carroll counties were in violation of a Maryland Supreme Court ruling if they voted in Frederick County Delegation meetings. Only 2.6 percent of District 5 residents, or about 3,500 people, live in Frederick County. In 1995, an opinion from the Attorney General of Maryland stated that county delegations are "not subject to the 'one-person/one-vote' require" of the Equal Protection Clause of the Fourteenth Amendment of the U.S. Constitution.

In March 2023, Bouchat sent a letter to his House Republican colleagues in which he questioned their tactics during floor debates, asserting that they were being too performative during floor debates and urging them to "look inward for corrective measures that increase our future success rates". Later that week, six of the most vocal members of the House Republican Caucus released a letter criticizing Bouchat's comments, arguing that the party was able to reach its 50-seat minority in 2014 by speaking out against Democratic taxes and spending. Bouchat agreed that Republicans should contest Democrats in the 2026 legislative elections, but said "we need to stop annoying them" until then.

Personal life
Bouchat divorced his first wife, Carmelita Seda-Carothers, in 1997, defending himself in court during the divorce proceedings. That same year, Bouchat was convicted of second-degree assault in a domestic abuse with Seda-Carothers. In July 2007, he divorced his second wife, April Elizabeth Shook, who claimed that Bouchat had physically and verbally assaulted her as they sought their divorce. Her abuse claims were thrown out by Judge Thomas Stansfield after no evidence proving the abuse could be produced. In September, Bouchat filed a lawsuit against Shook, charging her claim that he had physically abused her destroyed his campaign.

In February 2014, the Internal Revenue Service placed a $42,526 tax lien on Bouchat, which was the result of embezzlement by his daughter, Tawni Bouchat, whom he had employed as a bookkeeper at his own business. The lien led him to initiate criminal charges against Tawni for stealing $21,120 from his company, which she was found guilty of in January 2015. In November 2018, after winning election to the Carroll County Board of Commissioners, Bouchat settled the tax lien by paying $13,000 to the IRS.

Tawni Bouchat died of a fentanyl overdose in 2017, which he says "threw me into a depression, it threw me into alcoholism, so I always advise people out there when you've suffered a loss of someone very close you are extremely vulnerable to become an addict yourself."

Political positions

COVID-19 pandemic
In April 2020, Bouchat voted against closing the Northern Landfill in Westminster, Maryland for 15 days to reduce risk of spreading COVID-19. Later that month, he voted to reopen the landfill early with reduced hours and restrictions preventing residents outside the county from using it.

In June 2020, Bouchat attended and spoke at a Reopen Maryland rally in Westminster to protest the state's COVID-19 restrictions. At the rally, he suggested allowing businesses to set their own policies on when people need to wear masks. In July, he wrote an op-ed for the Carroll County Times that questioned the value of wearing masks in public.

In August 2021, Bouchat suggested that the Board of Commissioners boycott the annual Maryland Association of Counties Summer Conference over its masking recommendations, saying that he had cancelled his attendance to the event after learning about the policy. He later told Maryland Matters that he did not oppose masks or vaccines, but opposed mandates. In December 2021, Bouchat was the only commissioner to vote against instituting a modified mask policy at Carroll County government facilities, which required unvaccinated county government employees to wear a mask while indoors. In February 2022, Bouchat declined to attend the State of the County address at the Carroll Arts Center, which was attended by all other county commissioners, because of its indoor mask-wearing requirement. He instead opted to protest outside the building by handing out copies of a written speech to those walking in.

Government
In July 2019, Bouchat introduced a bill that would place a question on the 2020 ballot that, if approved, would change Carroll County's form of government from a commission to a charter. After the Board of Commissioners voted to hold off on discussions on converting to a charter government, Bouchat announced that he would not seek re-election to a second term as county commissioner in 2022. In November 2020, Bouchat voted to pass a resolution that would establish a nine-member committee to write a charter; the resolution failed to pass in a 2-3 vote.

In January 2021, Bouchat recused himself as a non-voting member of the county's Planning and Zoning Commission, and soon after filed motions to eliminate the non-voting positions from the county's Board of Education and Planning and Zoning Commission.  Both motions failed to gain a second and were not voted upon.

Social issues
In June 2020, Bouchat joined a Black Lives Matter protest in Westminster. Later that month, he proposed creating a heritage commission to recognize the history and achievements of African Americans in Carroll County.

In February 2022, Bouchat distributed copies of a printed speech at the annual State of the County address, in which he wrote that he believed that the board of commissioners would benefit from not being made up of "old Caucasian males," calling on women to "step up and take control of our local government".

State and national politics
In 2016, Bouchat ran as an unaffiliated candidate to the Republican National Convention in Maryland's 8th congressional district. He said that he would vote for Donald Trump on the first ballot if he voters sent him to the Convention, and hoped that Trump would pick John Kasich as his running mate.

In January 2021, Bouchat condemned the January 6 United States Capitol attack and compared the presidential transition to what happens with the Board of Commissioners:

In 2022, Bouchat endorsed former Maryland Secretary of Commerce Kelly Schulz for governor.

Taxes
In March 2023, Bouchat voted against an amendment that would remove a provision that indexed the state's gas tax to the consumer price index. The amendment failed by a 38-90 vote, with Bouchat being the only House Republican to vote against it.

Electoral history

Notes and references

Notes

References

External links
 

1967 births
21st-century American politicians
Community College of Baltimore County alumni
Republican Party members of the Maryland House of Delegates
Living people
People from Baltimore
University of Maryland, Baltimore County alumni
County commissioners in Maryland